Aechmea triticina is a plant species in the genus Aechmea. This species is endemic to eastern Brazil, known from the States of Espírito Santo and Rio de Janeiro.

References

triticina
Flora of Brazil
Plants described in 1892